Bryotropha gallurella is a moth of the family Gelechiidae. It is found in Portugal, Spain, southern France, Corsica, Sardinia, and Sicily.

The wingspan is 11–14 mm. The forewings are greyish brown to dark greyish brown, the central part heavily mixed with ochreous to ochreous brown. The extreme base has an ochreous to ochreous brown spot, followed by black blotches on the costa and tornus. The hindwings are pale ochreous grey at the base, but darker towards the apex. Adults have been recorded on wing from late March to early October, probably in two generations per year.

References

Moths described in 1952
gallurella
Moths of Europe